The following page displays the official seals, logos, wordmarks, and coats of arms of the cities and counties of the United States.

Alaska

Boroughs

Cities and towns

Arizona

California

Counties

Cities and towns

Municipal organizations

Historical

District of Columbia

Florida

Counties

Cities and towns

Historical

Georgia

Historical

Illinois

Iowa

Kansas

Louisiana

Historical

Maine

Counties

Cities and towns

Maryland

County seals

Municipal organizations

Historical

Massachusetts

Historical

Michigan

Historical

Minnesota

Mississippi

Nebraska

Nevada

New Hampshire

New Jersey

New York

North Carolina

Ohio

Oklahoma

Historical

Oregon

Pennsylvania

South Carolina

Historical

Tennessee

Texas

Vermont

Virginia

Historical

Washington

Historical

See also

 Flags of the U.S. states
 History of the flags of the United States
 Historical coats of arms of the U.S. states from 1876
 List of U.S. state, district, and territorial insignia – a list of state flags, seals and coats of arms
 Seals of governors of the U.S. states
 Flags of governors of the U.S. states
 United States heraldry

References

External links

Insignia
Insignia

Insignia

Counties of the United States
Cities in the United States